The Serbian League Belgrade (Serbian: Srpska Liga Beograd) is one of four sections of the Serbian League, the third national tier. The league is operated by the Belgrade FA. 16 teams compete in the league for the 2018–19 season. The top-seeded team will be promoted to the Serbian SuperLiga. The two bottom-seeded teams will be relegated to the Belgrade Zone League, the fourth-highest division overall in the Serbian football league system, while the team in 14th position will be participating in a relegation playoff match against the 3rd placed team from the Belgrade Zone League.

Team changes
The following teams have changed division since the 2017–18 season.

To Serbian League Belgrade
Promoted from Belgrade Zone League
 Brodarac
 Zvezdara

Relegated from Serbian First League
 None

From First League
Relegated to Belgrade Zone League
 Sopot
 BSK Batajnica

Promoted to Serbian First League
 Žarkovo

2018–19 teams

League table

References

External links
 Football Association of Serbia
 Football Association of Belgrade

Serbian League Belgrade seasons
Belgrade
Football in Belgrade